All-American News was a film production company in the U.S. bringing war propaganda newsreels and entertainment films to African American audiences.

Emmanuel M. Glucksman was a film industry veteran who produced All-American News films for African American audiences. He was paired with young African American filmmaker William D. Alexander, who worked on the newsreel production team, narrated, and did interviews, and Claude Barnett, an experienced journalist who also helped produce the films. Josh Binney directed some of the films.

The Library of Congress has a collection of All-American newsreels and films.

Filmography
The Negro Sailor (1945)
It Happened in Harlem (1945)
Chicago After Dark (1946), "a stream-lined feature"
Lucky Gamblers (1946)
Midnight Menace (1946)
Boarding House Blues (1948)
Killer Diller (1948 film) (1948)
The Joint is Jumping (1949)

References

Further reading

All-American News at Internet Archive.org

Film production companies of the United States
Propaganda film units